CAPA (Chabalier & Associates Press Agency) is a French press agency and production company founded on August 1, 1989, by . It is the largest production company for television reports and documentaries in France. The firm, which is part of Newen since 2011, produces about 150 hours of documentaries and television reports every year. It has 3 subsidiaries: CAPA Presse, CAPA Corporate and CAPA Drama.

Activity 
CAPA gained visibility in the 90's with the TV program 24 Heures, broadcast on Canal +. The show marks a new kind of offbeat journalism in France: as Hervé Chabalier explained it to Les Inrocks, in 2009 :"A channel had never delegated news gathering to an external company before".

Since then, CAPA notably produced L'Effet Papillon, from 2006 to 2018, and often collaborates to the direction and production of Envoyé Spécial, Spécial Investigation, Des Racines et des Ailes, Infrarouge, 66 minutes, and Pièces à conviction.

History 
Over the years, the group diversified, notably in fiction, with the creation of its subsidiary CAPA Drama. CAPA Drama produces Versailles, a TV show known as the most expensive French TV Show of all.

In 2007, the reporter Marc Garmirian is sent to Chad by CAPA Presse to investigate on the association L’Arche de Zoé and its controversial operation “Rescue Children”. Garmirian was arrested by the authorities and spent 11 days in prison with a few other humanitarians before getting back to France.

In June 2018, the two journalists, Sebastian Perez Pezzani and Didier Barral, who were making an investigation in Venezuela for “Caméléon”, a documentary series produced by CAPA Presse for the French channel 13ème Rue, got arrested by the venezuelan police. Both of them spent 10 days in prison before being released with the help of the French embassy.

In 2019, Netflix and CAPA Drama released Osmosis, the TV streaming’s second French original show.

CAPA notably received 3 Albert Londres Prize and 2 International Emmy Awards in fiction and documentary.

Executives 

 Guillaume Thouret: Group Managing Director (CAPA)
 Philippe Levasseur: Deputy Managing Director (CAPA Presse)
 Claude Chelli: Deputy CEO (CAPA Drama)
 Jacques Morel: Associate Director (CAPA Corporate)

Governance and corporate structure 
In February, 2010, Hervé Chabalier, CAPA main shareholder, sold 60% of his stakes to Newen.

In 2015, TF1 bought Newen.

In February 2016, Philippe Levasseur  ex reporter and documentaries author  is named chief executive of CAPA Presse.

Selective filmography

CAPA Presse

 Boy Soldier (G. De Maistre - Canal+ / France 3 – 1990)

Best Documentary – International Emmy Awards – 1990

Albert Londres award – 1990

 Shackled Children (H. Dubois – 52’ – M6 – 1993)

Nominated for Best Documentary – International Emmy Awards 1993

Social and political documentary award – BANFF 1993

 Organ Snatchers (M.-M. Robin – 57’ – 1993)

Albert Londres award – 1993

 Kidnap and Ransom: a secret war (D. André – 52’ – France 2 – 2000)

Grand Prix – FIGRA – 2000

Best documentary award – BANFF – 2000

 Missing Women (M. Loizeau, A. Marant – 52’ – ARTE – 2006)

Albert Londres award – 2006

Grand Prix / Public Award – FIGRA – 2007

 Rape in the Ranks: the Enemy within (P. Bourgaux – 28’ – France 2 – 2007)

Best International Investigative Documentary – NYIFF – 2009

 Planet for Sale (A. Marant – 90’ – ARTE – 2011)

Jury Special Award – FIGRA – 2012

 Goldman Sachs, the Bank that Runs the World (J. Fritel, M. Roche – 71’ – ARTE – 2012)

Jury Special Award – FIGRA – 2013

 Terror Studios (A. Marant - 85’ - Canal+ / Discovery - 2016)

Nomination Social Issues / Current Affairs – Realscreen Awards – 2017

Nomination Social & Investigative - BANFF Rockie Awards – 2017

Nomination Best Documentary - International Emmy Awards – 2017

CAPA Drama 

 Braquo
 Souviens-toi
 Versailles
 Osmosis
 Flic tout simplement

References

External links

French companies established in 1989
Mass media companies established in 1989
News agencies based in France
Television production companies of France
Mass media in Paris